Steven A. Davis is a New Zealand stunt man and actor known for his role of Gordy Leach in This Is Not My Life, and for playing Jayden's father on Power Rangers Samurai. In 2003 he wrote, produced, and acted in The Fanimatrix: Run Program, and is working as stuntman in the filming of The Hobbit: An Unexpected Journey.  His film The Fanimatrix has attracted a cult following, and by October 2003 had been downloaded 70,000 times.

Filmography

Television
 Legend of the Seeker (2 episodes, 2008) as Guard 
 Power Rangers R.P.M. (3 episodes, 2009) as City Guard / Mayor's Son / Thug
 Go Girls (1 episode, 2010) as Campbell
 This Is Not My Life (11 episodes, 2010) as Gordy Leach
 Spartacus: Gods of the Arena (3 episodes, 2011) as Indus
 Power Rangers Samurai (1 episode, 2011) as Jayden's Father

Film
 The Fanimatrix: Run Program (2003) as  Dante 
 Big Bad Wolves (2006) as Big Bad Wolf, Prince Charming

Stunts
 Vertical Limit (2000)
 Power Rangers R.P.M. (2009) 
 Spartacus: Blood and Sand (4 episodes, 2010) 
 The Warrior's Way (2010)

References

External links
 

Power Rangers Samurai
Living people
Year of birth missing (living people)
New Zealand male television actors
New Zealand stunt performers
Place of birth missing (living people)